Osman or Usman is the Turkish, Persian, Egyptian and Urdu, transliteration of the Arabic male given name Uthman.

In England however, Osman is an English surname whose history on English land dates back to the wave of migration that followed the Norman conquest of England of 1066, though it is pronounced with a long "o". Variant spellings include Osment and Osmond. The name comes from the Old English pre-7th century male personal name Osmaer, "oss" meaning god and "maer" fame; hence "god-fame". The name Osmar and Osmer (without surname) appears in the Domesday Book of 1086, for Leicestershire and Devonshire respectively, but the surname did not appear until the early part of the 13th century. On July 15, 1571, Mary Hosmer, daughter of Richard Hosmer, was christened in Brenchley, Kent, and on September 18, 1580, Jane Hosmer was also christened there. In April 1635, clothier James Hosmer, his wife Ann and two daughters Marie and Ann embarked from London on the Elizabeth bound for New England. They were among the earliest-recorded name bearers to settle in America. The first recorded spelling of the family name is shown to be that of William Osmere, which was dated 1230, in the Pipe rolls of Devonshire, during the reign of King Henry III.

Given name

Osman
Osman I (1258–1326), founder and namesake of the Ottoman Empire
Osman II (1604–1622), Ottoman sultan
Osman III (1699–1757), Ottoman sultan
Osman I of the Maldives, the Sultan of the Maldives in 1377
Osman II of the Maldives, the Sultan of Maldives from 1420 to 1421
Osman Aga of Temesvar (1670–1725), Turkish autobiographer
Osman or Uthman Beg (1350–1435), leader of the Turkoman tribal federation of Aq Qoyunlu
Osman Achmatowicz (1899–1988), Polish professor
Osman Ahmed, Somali ruler and the fifth Sultan of the Gobroon Dynasty
Osman Ali Atto ( 1940–2013), Somali warlord
Osman Jama Ali (born 1941), Somali politician
Osman Ali Khan, Asaf Jah VII (1886–1967), last Nizam of the kingdom of Hyderabad
Osman Arpacıoğlu (born 1947), Turkish footballer
Osman Atılgan (born 1999), German-Turkish footballer
Osman Bashiru (born 1989), Ghanaian footballer
Osman Baydemir (born 1971), Kurdish politician
Osman Birsen (born 1945), Turkish civil servant and former CEO of the Istanbul Stock Exchange
Osman Bölükbaşı (1913–2002), Turkish politician
Osman Bukari (born 1998), Ghanaian footballer
Osman Khalid Butt (born 1986), Pakistani actor, director, and writer
Osman Çakmak (born 1977), Turkish amputee football manager and former player
Osman Chávez (born 1984), Honduran footballer
Osman Cleander Baker (1812–1871), American biblical scholar and bishop
Osman Coşgül (1928–2001), Turkish long-distance runner
Osman Can Çötür (born 2001), Turkish footballer
Osman Đikić (1879–1912), Bosniak poet
Osman Duraliev (1939–2011), Bulgarian sport wrestler
Osman Durmuş (born 1947), Turkish physician and politician
Osman El-Sayed (1930–2013), 20th-century Egyptian Greco-Roman wrestler
Osman Eltayeb (1919–2011), Sudanese businessman and Honorary Consul of Sudan in Nigeria
Osman Ertuğ (born 1949), Cypriot Turkish diplomat
Osman Fazli (1632–1691), influential Sufi 
Osman Fuad (1895–1973), 39th head of the Imperial House of Osman, the former ruling dynasty of the Ottoman Empire, from 1954 to 1973
M Osman Ghani (1912–1989), Bangladeshi academic, Vice-chancellor of the University of Dhaka
Osman Gradaščević (died 1812), Bosniak nobleman
Osman Güneş (born 1952), Turkish bureaucrat
Osman Gürbüz (born 1962), Turkish criminal
Osman Necmi Gürmen (1927–2015), Turkish novelist
Osman Hadžikić (born 1996), Austrian footballer
Osman Haji (1920–1975), Somali politician
Osman Hamdi Bey (1842–1910), Ottoman statesman, painter, and archaeologist
Osman Hung (born 1979), Hong Kong actor and singer-songwriter of the Cantopop group EO2
Osman Kamara (born 1987), Sierra Leonean swimmer
Osman Karabegović (1911–1996), Yugoslav and Bosnian communist politician
Osman Cemal Kaygılı (1890–1945), Turkish writer and journalist
Osman Kebir, Sudanese governor of the North Darfur province of Sudan
Osman Yusuf Kenadid (1899–1972), Somali poet and ruler
Osman Zati Korol (1880–1946), officer of the Ottoman Army and a general of the Turkish Army
Osman Lins (1924–1978), Brazilian novelist and short story writer
Osman Faruk Loğoğlu (born 1941), Turkish diplomat
Osman López (born 1970), Colombian retired footballer
Osman Mahamuud, 19th-century Somali ruler, king of the Majeerteen Sultanate
Osman Metalla (born 1964), Albanian politician
Osman Mema (born 1939), Albanian footballer
Osman Mendez (born 1991), American soccer player
Osman Menezes Venâncio Júnior, Brazilian footballer
Osman Metalla, Albanian politician
Osman Mirzayev (1937–1991), Azerbaijani journalist, writer, and publicist
Osman Mohamud (born  1960), Somalian clan elder from Somaliland
Osman Nuri (disambiguation), various people
Osman Nuri Pasha (disambiguation), various people
Osman Öcalan (born 1958), Kurdish militant leader
Osman Orsal, Turkish photo-journalist
Osman Ahmed Osman (1917–1999), Egyptian engineer, contractor, entrepreneur, and politician
Osman Osmani, Afghan governor of Ghazni Province, Afghanistan
Osman Özköylü (born 1971), Turkish retired footballer and coach
Osman Pamukoğlu (born 1947), Turkish retired general and politician, founder of the Rights and Equality Party
Osman Pazvantoğlu (1758–1807), Bosnian Ottoman soldier, governor and rebel against Ottoman rule
Osman Saleh Sabbe (1932–1987), Eritrean revolutionary
Osman Ali Sadagar (1856–1948), Bengali-Assamese politician and educationist
Osman Saqizli (died 1672), Ottoman dey and pasha of Tripolis
Osman F. Seden (1924–1998), Turkish film director, screenwriter, and film producer
Osman Murillo Segura (born 1985), Costa Rican judoka
Osman Taka (died 1887), Cham Albanian leader and dancer
Osman Murat Ülke (born 1970), Turkish conscientious objector
Osman Waqialla (1925–2007), Sudanese artist and calligrapher
Osman Omar Wehliye, Somalian police commissioner
Osman Yunis (born 1982), Sierra Leonean footballer

Surname
People with the surname include:
Abdillahi Abokor Osman, Somali politician
Amin Osman (1898–1946), Egyptian politician
Arnaut Osman, a hero of Serbian and Albanian epic poetry
Arthur Arnold Osman (1893–1972), British nephrologist
Bayezid Osman (1924–2017), 44th Head of the Imperial House of Osman
Charles J. Osman (1851–1922), Canadian businessman and politician
Dan Osman (1963–1998), American extreme sport practitioner
Diid Osman (born 1968), English bass guitarist in the Britpop band Sleeper
Farida Osman (born 1995), Egyptian swimmer
Harry Osman (1911–1998), English footballer
Hasbullah Osman, Malaysian politician
Jean-Claude Osman (born 1947), French retired footballer
Leon Osman (born 1981), English former footballer
Louis Osman (1914–1996), English artist, architect, goldsmith, and medallist
Maliki Osman (born 1965), Singaporean politician
Marina Osman (born 1965), Belarusian pianist and concertmaster
Mat Osman (born 1967), English musician
Matthew Osman (born 1983), English footballer
Mike Osman (born 1959), English radio presenter, impressionist, and entertainer
Natalie Osman (born 1989), American professional wrestler and valet
Oleksandr Osman (born 1996), Ukrainian footballer
Richard Osman (born 1970), British television presenter, producer, and director
Russell Osman (born 1959), English former footballer
Tanburi Büyük Osman Bey (1816–1885), Ottoman composer and tanbur player
Topal Osman (1883–1923), Ottoman militia leader
Topal Osman Pasha (1663–1733), Ottoman grand vizier
William Osman (born 1991), American engineer and Youtuber

Ousmane

Ousmane Ngom (born 1955), Senegalese politician
Ousmane Dembélé (born 1997), French Footballer

Usman
Usman Afzaal (born 1977), English cricketer
Usman Ahmed (born 1981), English boxer
Usman Ali Isani, Pakistani bureaucrat
Usman Bengali (died 1570s), Muslim scholar based in Sambhal
Usman bin Haji Muhammad Ali, Indonesian marine and saboteur during Konfrontasi
Usman dan Fodio (1754–1817), African leader also known as Shehu Uthman Dan Fuduye
Usman Garuba (born 2002), Spanish professional basketball player
Usman Gondal (born 1987), Pakistani footballer
Usman Khan (terrorist) (1991-2019), British terrorist and perpetrator of the 2019 London Bridge stabbing
Usman Khawaja (born 1986), Australian cricketer
Usman Sarwar (born 1983), Pakistani cricketer
Usman Serajuddin (1258-1357), Bengali Islamic scholar
Ahmed Usman (1951–2021),  Nigerian military administrator 
Fakih Usman (1904–1968), Indonesian Islamic leader and politician
Khalid Usman (born 1986), Pakistani cricketer
Khwaja Usman, Afghan chieftain and Mughal opponent
M.T. Usman, Nigerian government official
Mariam Usman (born 1990), Nigerian weightlifter

Uthman

Uthman ibn Affan (580–656), the third Islamic caliph and son-in-law of Muhammad

Arabic surname
Abdul Osman (born 1987), Ghanaian-born English footballer
Ahmed Osman (author) (born 1934), Egyptian author
Ahmed Elmi Osman, Somali politician
Aziz M. Osman (born 1962), Malaysian actor and director
Cedi Osman (born 1995), Macedonian-Turkish basketball player
Hadiza Bala Usman (born 1976), Nigerian activist and politician
Hâfiz Osman (1642–1698), Ottoman calligrapher
Hafiz Osman (born 1984), Singaporean professional soccer player
Kara Yülük Osman, late 14th- and early 15th-century leader of the Turkmen tribal federation Ak Koyunlu
Leon Osman (born 1981), English footballer of Turkish Cypriot descent
Levent Osman (born 1977), Australian footballer of Turkish descent
Mahamane Ousmane (born 1951), first democratically elected President of Niger
Magued Osman (born 1951), Egyptian academic
Mohammad Usman (1912–1948), Indian military office
Zuber Usman (1916–1976), Indonesian author

See also

Osman Nuri (disambiguation)
Osman Nuri Pasha (disambiguation)
Osman Pasha (disambiguation)

References

Arabic-language surnames
Arabic masculine given names
Moroccan masculine given names
Egyptian masculine given names
Somali masculine given names
Bosniak masculine given names
Bosnian masculine given names
Turkish masculine given names
Pakistani masculine given names

ru:Усман